Osečnice is a municipality and village in Rychnov nad Kněžnou District in the Hradec Králové Region of the Czech Republic. It has about 300 inhabitants.

Administrative parts
Villages of Lomy, Proloh and Sekyrka are administrative parts of Osečnice.

References

Villages in Rychnov nad Kněžnou District